, also known as Entertainment Graphic Innovation, or Studio ENGI, is a Japanese animation studio founded by Kadokawa, Sammy Corporation, and Ultra Super Pictures, and is a subsidiary of Kadokawa Corporation.

History
On April 4, 2018, Kadokawa established ENGI, while Sammy and Ultra Super Pictures invested on the company as well. It began operation on June 1, 2018. The studio is based in Suginami, Tokyo. Former Qtec representative director Tohru Kajio is serving as representative director for the new company. Board members include Kadokawa's Hiroshi Horiuchi and Takeshi Kikuchi, Kadokawa subsidiary Glovision's Shun'ichi Okabe, and Sammy's Ken'ichi Tokumura.

ENGI is an animation studio that mainly works within the anime industry for its shareholders Kadokawa, Sammy and Ultra Super Pictures, including but not limited to TV productions, game animations, Pachinko animations and theatrical films. The studio is responsible for producing the upcoming Kantai Collection anime, and is working on the upcoming animated comic series Okamoto Kitchen.

On March 25, 2020, it was announced ENGI opened its second studio ENGI Kurashiki Studio in Kurashiki, Okayama.

Works

Television series

Original net animation

References

External links
 
 ENGI english website

 
Sega Sammy Holdings
Animation studios in Tokyo
Japanese animation studios
Japanese companies established in 2018
Mass media companies established in 2018
Suginami
Kadokawa Corporation subsidiaries
Joint ventures
Ultra Super Pictures